Hidden Treasures is an album released by San Francisco-based alternative rock band Stroke 9 in 2004. It is composed of formerly unreleased tracks and other demos. While only seen in digital form, it was sold as a physical, retail CD on the records man! records label.

Track listing 
 "Thanks For Playing"
 "Please Don't Leave Me Out"
 "Liar"
 "Medicinal Marriage"
 "Laughing At Myself"
 "Burning To Change (EDTV)"
 "This And That"
 "Ride It"
 "Kyoto"
 "Customer Service"
 "Little Black Backpack (Live at New Georges 1998)"

Stroke 9 albums
2004 compilation albums